The Momsen lung was a primitive underwater rebreather used before and during World War II by American submariners as emergency escape gear. It was invented by Charles Momsen (nicknamed "Swede"). It was introduced as standard equipment on Porpoise (P)-class and -class boats.

The device recycled the breathing gas by using a counterlung containing soda lime to remove the carbon dioxide. The lung was initially filled with oxygen and connected to a mouthpiece by twin hoses containing one-way valves, one for breathing in and the other for breathing out.

Thirteen men (of thirty survivors) left the forward escape trunk: five were picked up by the Japanese; three more reached the surface "but were unable to hang on or breathe and floated off and drowned"; the fate of the other five is unknown. Not all the escapees from the trunk used the Momsen lung. An officer had his mouthpiece knocked out shortly after leaving the submarine. One of the trunk ascents was made without a Momsen lung. Many were unable to leave the trunk or discouraged from attempting an escape. Most of the crew perished.

The Momsen lung was replaced by the Steinke hood beginning in 1962. The British Royal Navy used the similar Davis Submerged Escape Apparatus, but it was clumsy to use. They adopted the practice of "blow and go" in which the sailor would exhale before ascent to avoid air over-expanding the lungs, which could cause them to rupture. This has since been found to be higher risk than a constant relaxed exhalation during ascent. One writer suggested that "the Momsen Lung concept may have killed far more submariners than it rescued".

See also

References

External links
US Navy History of the Momsen Lung
"Submarine Safety Device Proven." Popular Science Monthly, September 1929, pp. 30–31.

Rebreathers
Industrial breathing sets
Submarine rescue equipment